Nick Kyrgios and Jack Sock defeated Ivan Dodig and Austin Krajicek in the final, 7–5, 6–4 to win the men's doubles tennis title at the 2022 Washington Open.

Raven Klaasen and Ben McLachlan were the reigning champions, but chose to compete with different partners in Los Cabos instead.

Seeds

Draw

Draw

Qualifying

Seeds

Qualifiers
  Emil Ruusuvuori /  Luke Saville

Qualifying draw

References

External links
Main draw
Qualifying draw

Citi Open - Doubles